This is a list of songs that either originated in blackface minstrelsy or are otherwise closely associated with that tradition. Songwriters and publication dates are given where known.

A

 "Alabama Joe" (a.k.a. "Shall Trelawney Die") (before 1855)
 "The Arkansas Traveler"

B

 "Babylon Is Fallen", Henry Clay Work (1863)
 "Back Side of Albany"
 "The Band of Niggers! From 'Ole Virginny State'" (1844)
 "The Bee-Gum", G. Willig (1833)
 "Billy Patterson", Dan Emmett (1860)
 "The Black Brigade", Dan Emmett (1863)
 "Blue Tail Fly" (a.k.a. "Jimmy Crack Corn") c. 1846
 "The Boatman's Dance", credited to Dan Emmett (1843) (Emmett, Boston, 1840s or 1842) (Nathan 131–2, 186, 191, 193, 320–3)
 "Bonja Song" (c. 1820)
 "Bowery Gals" (a.k.a. "As I Was Lumbering")
 "Bress Dat Lubly Yaller Gal"
 "Briggs' Breakdown", Z. Bacchus

C

 "Camptown Races", Stephen Foster, (1850)
 "Carry Me Back to Old Virginny"* James A. Bland
 "Charleston Gals" (1844)
 "Ching a Ring Chaw"
 "Claire de Kitchen", performed as early as 1832 by T. D. Rice and George Washington Dixon
 "Clar de Track", 1840s.
 "Clem Titus' Jig", published by Dan Emmett
 "Coal Black Rose" (c. 1829)
 "Come Back Stephen"/"Come Back Steben"
 "Cornfield Green"
 "Cynthia Sue"

D
 "Dandy Broadway Swell", (1849)
 "Dandy Jim from Caroline" (and variants), Dan Emmett (c. 1844)
 "Dar He Goes! Dats Him!", Dan Emmett (1844)
 "Dere Be Any Malted Licker Here?" 
 "Darkey Money Musk" (a.k.a. "Money Must", "Holyrood or Moneymusk", "Sir Archibald Grant of Monymusk's Reel"), Daniel Dow (1780)
 "Darkies' Pastime"
 "Dearest May"
 "Dick Myers' Jig", published by Dan Emmett
 "Dinah's Wedding Day"
 "Division Street Jig", Z. Bacchus
 "Dixie" (a.k.a. "Dixie's Land", "I Wish I Was in Dixie"), Dan Emmett contested, 1859
 "Do Fare You Well Ladies" (1840s)
 "Do I Do I Don't Do Nothing" (1825)
 "Dr. Hekok Jig", Z. Bacchus, published by Dan Emmett(Nathan 200, 203, 208, 486–7)

E

 "Eelam Moore Jig", Dan Emmett (before 1854)
 "Effects of the Brogue", (a.k.a. "Tatter Jack") Dan Emmett (by 1861)

F

 "Far [Fare] You Well Ladies"
 "Farewell My Lilly Dear", Stephen Foster (1851)
 "The Fine Old Color'd Gentleman", Dan Emmett (1843)
 "De Floating Scow Quickstep" (a.k.a. "Oh Carry Me Back to Old Virginny"*), E. Ferrett (1847)
 "Forty Hosses in de Stable", J. Kierman (1840s)
 "The Free Nigger", sung by R. W. Pelham (1841)

G

 "Gantz's Jig", published by Dan Emmett
 "Genuine Negro Jig", published by Dan Emmett
 "Get along Home, Cindy",  possibly developed from a minstrel tune "Cindy Lou"
 "Ginger Blue" (1841)
 "Grape Vine Twist"
 "Gonna Eat Ma Chicken 'Til I'm Fried"
 "Gray Goose and Gander"
 "Guinea Maid"
 "Gumbo Chaff" (a.k.a. "Gombo Chaff"), early 1830s
 "Gwine to de Mill", Jay R. Jenkins (1846)

H

 "Happy Are We Darkies So Gay"
 "Hard Times", Tom Briggs (1855)
 "Hell on the Wabash Jig"
 "High Daddy", Dan Emmett (1863)
 "Hop Light, Loo", Dan Emmett (before 1854)
 "Hot Corn"

I

 "I Ain't Got Time to Tarry" (a.k.a. "The Land of Freedom"), Dan Emmett (1858)
 "I'm Going Home to Dixie", Dan Emmett (1861)
 "I'm Gwine ober de Mountain", Dan Emmett (1843)
 "I Saw the Beam in My Sister's Eye"
 "Ireland and Virginia"

J

 "Jack on the Green", Dan Emmett
 "James Crow", Sam Carusi (1832)
 "Jenny Get Your Hoe Cake Done", popularized by Joel Sweeney (1840)
 "Jim Along Josey", credited to "an Eminent professor" and performed by John N. Smith (1840) 
 "Jim Brown" (1835)
 "Johnny Boker or De Broken Yoke in de Coaling Ground" (1840)
 "Johnny Roach", Dan Emmett (1859)
 "Jolly Raftsman"
 "Jordan Is a Hard Road to Travel", Dan Emmett (1853)
 "The Jolly Raftsman"
 "Juba"
 "Juber" (1840s)
 "Jumbo Jum" (1840)
 "Jump Jim Crow", (c. 1823, popularized by T.D. Rice in 1828)

K

 "Kingdom Coming" (a.k.a. "Year of Jubilo"), Henry Clay Work (1862)

L

 "Land of Canaan", played by J. Simmons (before 1860)
 "A Life by the Galley Fire"
 "De Long Island Nigger", Emma Snow (?) (c. 1848)
 "Long Time Ago", John Cole (1833)
 "Loozyanna Low Grounds", Dan Emmett (1859)
 “Lucy Long” (see http://utc.iath.virginia.edu/minstrel/lucylongfr.html)
 "Lucy Neal"/"Lucy Neale" J. P. Carter (1844)
 "Lynchburg Town"

M

 "Marty Inglehart Jig", Dan Emmett (1845)
 "Mary Blane" (a.k.a. "Mary Blain"), Billy Whitlock (1846)
 "Massa Is a Stingy Man" (1841)
 "Merry Sleigh Bells"
 "Miss Lucy Long" (a.k.a. "Lucy  Long", "Miss Lucy Song"), Dan Emmett and Frank Brower (1844), or Billy Whitlock (1842) or possibly Billy Whitlock (1838)
 "Moze Haymar Jig", Dan Emmett (1845)
 "My Old Kentucky Home", Stephen Foster (1853)
 "My First Jig", Dan Emmett (c. 1840s)
 "My Long Tail Blue" (1830s)
 "My Old Aunt Sally" (1843)
 "My Old Dad"/"Old Dad" (1844)

N

 "Negro Jig", Dan Emmett (1845)
 "Nelly Was a Lady", Stephen Foster (1849)
 "New York Gals", Emma Snow?
 "The Newton Jig", James Buckley (1860)
 "Nigga General"
 "Nigger on de Wood Pile", Dan Emmett (1845)

O

 "(O Lud Gals) Gib Me [Us] Chaw Terbakur", words by Dan Emmett (1843)
 "Oh, Come along John" a.k.a. "Walk along John" (1843)
 "Oh, Ladies All!", Dan Emmett (published 1858, probably written in the 1840s)
 "Oh Lemuel", Stephen Foster (1850)
 "Oh! Susanna", Stephen Foster (1847)
 "Old Bob Ridley", Charles White (1855)
 "Old Dan Tucker", words by Dan Emmett (1843)
 "Old Folks at Home", Stephen Foster (1851)
 "Old Joe", F. M. Brower (1844)
 "Old Joe Golden"
 "Old Johnny Boker"
 "Old King Crow"
 "Old K. Y. Ky.", Dan Emmett (1860)
 "Old Tar River"/Ole Tare River" (1840)
 "Old Uncle Ned", Stephen Foster (1848)
 "Ole Bull and Old Dan Tucker" (1844)
 "The Ole Grey Goose" (1844)
 "De Ole Jawbone" (and variants), perhaps Joel Sweeney (1840)
 "Ole Pee Dee", J. P. Carter (1844)
 "Ole Virginny Break Down" (1841)
 "The One Horse Open Sleigh", (a.k.a.  "Jingle Bells") James Lord Pierpont (1857)
 "Joe Sweeney's Jig", published by Dan Emmett
 "Owl Creek Quickstep", Dan Emmett

P

 "Pea Patch Jig", Dan Emmett
 "Peel's Jig"
 "Peter Story Jig", Dan Emmett
 "Philadelphia Gals"
 "Philisee Charcoal"
 "Picayune Butler (Ahoo! Ahoo!)"
 "Picayune Butler's Come to Town" (before 1847)
 "Polly Wolly Doodle
 "Possum up the Gum-Tree"

Q

 "Quaker's Jig", R. Myers

R

 "Ring, Ring de Banjo", Stephen Foster (1851)
 "Rise Old Napper"
 "Road to Richmond", Dan Emmett (1864)
 "Rob Ridley", Charles White (1855)
 "Rock Susana", Horace Weston (1887)
 "Root, Hog or Die", Dan Emmett (c. late 1840s or early 1850s)
 "Rosa Lee"

S

 "Sad to Leave Our Tater Land" (early 1850s)
 "Sandy Boy", possibly Phil Rice (before 1858)
 "Sandy Gibson's", Dan Emmett (1859)
 "Seely Simpkins Jig", Dan Emmett
 "Settin' on a Rail" (1836)
 "Shoo Fly, Don't Bother Me" (1869)
 "Sich a Gettin' Up Stairs" (c. 1834)
 "Singing Darkey of the Ohio"
 "Skeeters Do Bite"
 "Sliding Jenny Jig", R. Myers
 "Someone in de House wif Dinah", possibly Phil Rice (before 1858)
 "Stop Dat Knocking", A. F. Winnemore (1847)
 "Sugar Cane Green"
 "Sugar in a Gourd"
 "Suke of Tennessee"
 "Susey Brown"/"Suzy Brown"
 "Sweep Oh!"

T

 "Tell Me Josey Whar You Bin" (1840)
 "To the Cornfields Away"
 "Tom Brigg's Jig", published by Dan Emmett
 "'Twill Nebber Do to Gib It up So", Dan Emmett (1843)

U

 "Uncle Gabriel" (1848)

V

 "Van Bramer's Jig", published by Dan Emmett
 "Virginia's Lubly Ground"

W
 "Walk Along John" (1843)
 "Walk Jaw Bone" (c. 1840)
 "Westchester Nigga Song"
 "Whar Did You Come From?" (subtitled "Knock a Nigger Down"), performed by Joel Sweeney (1840)
 "Whar Is de Spot We Were Born?"
 "What O' Dat", Dan Emmett (1859)
 "Whoop Jamboree Jig"
 "Who's Dat Knocking"
 "Who's Dat Nigga Dar a Peepin" (1844)
 "Wide Awake" a.k.a. "Dar's a Darkey in de Tent", Dan Emmett (early 1859)
 "[In de/In the] Wild Raccoon Track"
 "De Wild Goose-Nation", Dan Emmett (1844)

Y

 "Yellow Corn"

Z

 "Zip Coon" (a.k.a. "Old Zip Coon"), performed by George Washington Dixon (1829? 1835?)

Notes

References
 Abel, E. Lawrence (2000). Singing the New Nation: How Music Shaped the Confederacy, 1861-1865. Mechanicsburg, Pennsylvania: Stackpole Books.
 Cockrell, Dale (1997). Demons of Disorder: Early Blackface Minstrels and Their World. Cambridge University Press.
 Lott, Eric (1993). Love and Theft: Blackface Minstrelsy and the American Working Class. Oxford University Press. .
 Mahar, William J. (1999). Behind the Burnt Cork Mask: Early Blackface Minstrelsy and Antebellum American Popular Culture. Chicago: University of Illinois Press.
 Nathan, Hans (1962). Dan Emmett and the Rise of Early Negro Minstrelsy. Norman: University of Oklahoma Press.
 Sacks, Howard L. and Sacks, Judith Rose (1993). Way up North in Dixie: A Black Family's Claim to the Confederate Anthem. Washington: Smithsonian Institution Press.
 Winans, Robert B. (1985). Liner notes to The Early Minstrel Show. New York: Recorded Anthology of American Music, Inc.

See also
 Hokum
 Coon song
 Minstrel show

 
Blackface minstrel songs, list of